Aleksandra Petrovna Korukovets (born October 1, 1976), née Sorokina, is a Russian volleyball player. She was a member of the national team that won the silver medal at the 2004 Summer Olympics in Athens.

References

External links
 
 
 

1976 births
Living people
People from Sovetsky District, Saratov Oblast
Russian women's volleyball players
Olympic volleyball players of Russia
Volleyball players at the 2004 Summer Olympics
Olympic silver medalists for Russia
Olympic medalists in volleyball
Medalists at the 2004 Summer Olympics
Sportspeople from Saratov Oblast